Steffen Zeibig (born 11 June 1977 in Dresden) is a disabled equestrian from Germany. He has been on three silver medal winning teams and won a bronze at the 2016 Summer Paralympics. He is part of the team that will represent Germany in Equestrian at the 2020 Summer Paralympics

Reference

External links
 
 
 

1977 births
Living people
German male equestrians
German dressage riders
Sportspeople from Dresden
Paralympic equestrians of Germany
Paralympic silver medalists for Germany
Paralympic bronze medalists for Germany
Equestrians at the 2008 Summer Paralympics
Equestrians at the 2012 Summer Paralympics
Equestrians at the 2016 Summer Paralympics
Equestrians at the 2020 Summer Paralympics
Paralympic medalists in equestrian